VSDC Free Video Editor is a non-linear editing (NLE) application developed by Flash-Integro LLC. The program is capable of processing high-resolution footage including 4K UHD, 3D and VR 360-degree videos. VSDC allows for applying post production effects, live color correction, and motion tracking. It supports VirtualDub plug-ins as well as the ability to capture video from screen, record voice, save multimedia files to numerous formats including those pre-configured for publishing on Facebook, Vimeo, YouTube, Instagram, and Twitter.

Overview 

VSDC runs on Windows 2000 and later. The editor supports video, audio, and image files recorded on smartphones, action cameras, professional cameras, drones, and can be used for all common video editing tasks necessary for producing broadcast-quality, high-definition video.

Video processing

Basic video editing features 

 Cutting, splitting into parts, merging, trimming, cropping, rotating, flipping, playback reversal, changing volume
 Resizing, quality and resolution settings
 Video stabilization
 Speed change, including 2 reframing modes for a perfect slow-motion effect
 Text and subtitle insertion
 Text effects: Recoloring, Shift position, Glyph FX
 Slideshow wizard offering 70+ transition effects
 Snapshots
 DeLogo filter that automatically hides unwanted elements in a video with a blurred or pixelated mask
 360-degree video to 2D video conversion
 3D video to 2D video conversion
 Quick Instagram-like filters
 In-painting mask modes to help repair corrupted pieces of an image or video.
 Full-featured text editor for titles and text-related effects. 
 Embedded video converter supporting more than 20 formats
 Built-in screen recorder
 Built-in voice recorder

Advanced post-production 

Motion tracking—the software allows for tracking the movement of any element in a video and attaching a title, an icon, an image, or a mask to the resulted trajectory. With this feature, users can apply a censorship mask to a moving object, and make a title follow the object it's attached to.
Color correction
Apart from the standard tools of automatic contrast, brightness, and temperature adjustment, VSDC offers color correction solutions:

 LUT editor that allows users to apply built-in and 3rd-party LUTs within VSDC, as well as create unique custom LUTs and export them for future use in 3-rd party editors
 RGB curve modifying the aspect of the whole video or image per selected color (red, green, blue or white). 
 Lift, Gamma, Gain & Offset color wheels for primary color correction
 Hue Saturation curves defining color region per six colors and enables to modify the aspect of a video or an image based on the selected color. 
 Gradient tool allowing for creating a gradual blend between multiple colors
 20+ standard color adjustments

Mask tool – enables to apply one or several filters to a certain part of a video or an image
30+ blending modes
Movement and Time remapping – the objects on the scene can move following a chosen trajectory with the speed set by keyframes
Animation – illusion of motion and change of any static objects in the scene by means of the rapid display of a sequence of these objects
Chroma Key  – 3 modes for removing any color from the video (typically used for replacing green background): HSL, YUV, and "By Chroma Key mask"
Video effects:
 15 filters including De-interlacing, Pixelize, De-logo and Blur
 8 transformation effects including Zoom, Mirror, Distort, and Resample
 OpenGL effects: Lens flare, Bokeh glare, and Raindrops
 A set of transition effects including transparency adjustment (Paper burn, Flow transformation, Shattered glass, Page turn and more)
 Bezier curve animation editing
 Dynamic TV effects (Aging TV, Broken TV, Noise TV) 
 VirtualDub plugins support

AI Art Generator - the feature that allows for producing artistic interpretations of images and videos.
Face Landmarks - the AI-powered tool that allows for placing a stylized motion-tracked mask on a face of a person in the video.
Charts and diagrams - 3D charts including Pie, Radar, Bar, Spline, Step Line, Spline area, Funnel, Pyramid, etc. for optimized display of any complex data.
360-degree and 3D video editing

Audio processing 

VSDC allows for splitting a video into audio and video layers and editing them as separate elements: as waveforms and video tracks.
Audio editing tools and effects:
 The Audio Spectrum tool animates a waveform to the rhythm of music or any other sounds.
 The built-in Voice over feature allows for recording voice and adding it to the footage.
 Audio amplitude effects (normalization, fading in and out, amplification) help to correct an imperfect soundtrack.
 Delay, time-stretch and reverse effects are tailored to give audio tracks relevant sounding: as if sung by a chorus, stretched in time or played backward.
 DeNoise tools (Median filter and Audio gate) for audio noise reduction.
 Simultaneous work with several audio tracks
 Edit the beat - a tool for synchronizing video effects and music beat automatically.

Formats and codecs

See also
 List of video editing software

References

External links 
 

Video editing software
Proprietary software
Video editing software for Windows
Freeware